John Andrew "Andy" Verity (born 8 April 1969 in Leeds) is an English financial journalist, currently working for BBC News as an economics correspondent.

After being raised in Barnet, he became a financial journalist in the mid-1990s. He formerly presented the daily BBC Radio Five Live show Wake Up to Money with Mickey Clark, until July 2013 when he was replaced by Adam Parsons.

In March 2012 he married a fellow BBC journalist.

External links
Wake Up to Money

British business and financial journalists
BBC Radio 5 Live presenters
1969 births
Living people
People from the London Borough of Barnet